Alexander Weinstein is an American short story writer. He is an associate professor of English at Siena Heights University. He is also director of The Martha's Vineyard Institute of Creative Writing. He is best known for his 2016 collection Children of the New World, which was chosen by The New York Times as one of the 100 Notable Books of 2016.

Early life and education
Weinstein was born in Brooklyn, New York, New York. He graduated from Naropa University, earning a Bachelors in Arts. He then went on to Indiana University, earning dual masters in English and Creative Writing-Fiction in 2008.

Short stories
 "The Apocalypse Tales", Notre Dame Review
 "The Cartographers", Chattahoochee Review
 "Children of the New World", Pleiades
 "Excerpts from the World Authorized Dictionary", Cream City Review
 "The Final Days of Father Troll", Western Humanities Review
 "Heartland", Pleiades
 "The Great Flood", Permafrost
 "Ice Age", Natural Bridge
 "Impossible Shapes", Sou’Wester
 "Migration", PRISM International
 "Rocket Night", Southern Indiana Review
 "Shared Love", Midwestern Gothic

Collections

 Children of the New World: Stories, Picador
 Universal Love: Stories, Picador

Non-fiction
 "Towards a Moral Fiction", Pleiades
 "Reincarnations of Space-Men", Lalitamba

References

External links
Author's website

Living people
Indiana University alumni
American science fiction writers
People from Ann Arbor, Michigan
21st-century American non-fiction writers
Naropa University alumni
Year of birth missing (living people)